David Oliver Cauldwell (June 17, 1897 – August 30, 1959) was a prolific and pioneering sexologist, who coined the term transsexual as used in its current definition. Many of his monographs on sex, psychology, or health were published by Emanuel Haldeman-Julius in such forms as Big Blue Books. He was the editor of Sexology magazine's question and answer department. Cauldwell and Harry Benjamin were "two early and important American voices on transsexuality".

Biography
He was born on June 17, 1897 in Cleveland, Ohio to Gilbert Cauldwell, a surgeon; and Virginia Oliver-Wright.  Cauldwell reports himself as having had an interest in sexual anatomy since his childhood.  He studied medicine at the Chester College of Medicine and Surgery (later merged with Loyola University Chicago) and at Universidad Nacional Autónoma de México.  After several years as a private general practitioner, Cauldwell became an Associate Medical Officer of the Department of War, and as a contract surgeon for the Army, and became a neuro-psychiatrist for the Department of War.  In 1945, Cauldwell ended active practice to become a writer on topics of health, notably sexology.

In 1949 he used the term transsexual in his essay Psychopathia Transexualis to describe individuals whose sex assigned at birth was different from their gender identity. Cauldwell distinguished “biological sex” from “psychological sex”, and saw the latter as determined by social conditioning.  He denied that there were modes of thinking intrinsically linked to male or female biology.  Primarily because of this view of gender as plastic, and secondarily because of the limitations of medical science, he regarded sex reassignment surgery as an unacceptable response to transsexualism, and instead advocated that it be treated as a mental disorder. He advocated acceptance of homosexuality and of transvestism.

He died on August 30, 1959 in El Paso, Texas of cirrhosis of the liver. He was buried in Evergreen Cemetery in El Paso, Texas.

References

Further reading 
Cauldwell, David Oliver. The Diary of a Sexologist: Intimate Observations and Experiences Revealed When a Doctor Tells His Story Haldeman-Julius Big Blue Book B-821 (1949).

Works 

[The titles of the Haldeman-Julius publications were chosen by or at the insistence of Haldeman-Julius, to provoke sales.]

American sexologists
1897 births
1959 deaths
Deaths from cirrhosis
Transgender studies academics